Jean-Baptiste Lallemand (1716–1803) was a French artist born in  Dijon. He was mainly a painter and draftsman of  landscapes and genre works. He sometimes signed himself Lallemant or Allemanus. After a stay in Italy, he went to Paris and became a member of the Académie de Saint-Luc. He died in Paris.

Works 

The Musée des Beaux-Arts de Dijon owns many of his works, including a drawing and a painting showing the Château de Montmusard. His works also feature in the collections of the Musée Carnavalet and the Cabinet des estampes of the Bibliothèque nationale, both in Paris.

Paintings 
 The prince de Lambesc charging at the head of the régiment Royal allemand, 12 July 1789, oil on canvas - Musee Carnavalet
 Taking of the Bastille, 14 July 1789, oil on canvas - Musee Carnavalet
 Massacre of Jacques de Flesselles, 14 July 1789, oil on canvas
 Pillaging of the weapons at les Invalides, morning of 14 July 1789, oil on canvas
 c. 1790/1795 : Arrest of the governor of the Bastille, 14 July 1789, oil on canvas, 63 x 80 cm, Vizille, Musée de la Révolution française
 Pillaging of the Hôtel des Invalides 1789, oils
 Pyramid of Caius Cestius in Rome
 Bourgeois cookery

Drawings
 View of the city and port of Rouen, capture of the faubourg Saint-Sever, drawing
 View of the porte Saint-Maclou, ancient caves and courts, near the botanical gardens in  Rouen, drawing
 View of part of the city of Rouen and the promenades of the old palace, from the faubourg Saint-Sever, drawing
 View of the bourse in Rouen, seen from the porte Arangrie, drawing
 Second view of the bourse at the city of Rouen, drawing
 View of the salines of Lons-le-Saulnier, in Franche-Comté

Watercolour drawings 

 1775 c - La Halle aux Veaux, wash, pen and watercolour, Sbd, Dim: 18,5 cm x 32,3 cm Réserve dessins Musée Carnavalet

Engravings 

 Several city views, notably from Burgundy

In the engraving shown right, note the indication of major buildings by the placement one or more flying birds over them: one bird over the Tour des Ursulines, two over the cathedral, three over the seminary. The initials APDR signify Avec Privilèges Du Roi (with the king's privilege). This burin engraving has been hand-coloured—some roofs are covered with blue slates (as with the church), others are in red to indicate tiles.

Bibliography 
 Exhibition catalogue, "Un paysagiste dijonnais du XVIII° siècle: Jean-Baptiste Lallemand", Dijon, Musée des Beaux-Arts, 1954, by M. Quarré and Mme Geiger
 Claude-Gérard, Marcus Jean-Baptiste Lallemand, Paris, 1996

References

External links

1716 births
1803 deaths
Artists from Dijon
18th-century French painters
18th-century French engravers
French history painters
French genre painters
French male painters
French draughtsmen
18th-century French male artists